The American Pharoah Stakes is an American Thoroughbred horse race run annually near the end of September during the fall meet at Santa Anita Park in Arcadia, California. A Grade I event, it is open to two-year-old horses and is held at a distance of one and one-sixteenth miles on the dirt.

The American Pharoah Stakes was run as the Norfolk Stakes through 2011. In 2012, it was renamed to the FrontRunner Stakes after the lease with Oak Tree, the organization that formerly operated Santa Anita's fall meet, ended in 2010. It was renamed again in 2018 in honor of its 2014 winner, American Pharoah, who went on to win the U.S. Triple Crown in 2015.

This race is a Road to the Kentucky Derby Prep Season qualifying race.  The winner receives 10 points toward qualifying for the Kentucky Derby. It is also currently part of the Breeders' Cup Challenge series. The winner automatically qualifies for the Breeders' Cup Juvenile.

First run in 1970, it became a Grade I event in 1980 but was downgraded to Grade II status in 1993. However, the American Graded Stakes Committee announced its return to Grade I status for 2007.

The race was run over a distance of 1 mile from 1997 through 2001. It was run in two divisions in 1980.

Records
Speed record: (at current distance of 1 miles)
 1:41.27 - Ruler's Court (2003)

Most wins by a jockey:
 7 - Alex Solis (1985, 1991, 1999, 2001, 2003, 2005, 2008)

Most wins by a trainer:
 10 - Bob Baffert (1997, 2000, 2002, 2004, 2009, 2012, 2014, 2018, 2019, 2021)

Most wins by an owner:
 3 - Golden Eagle Farm (1990, 1992, 1997)

Winners

‡ In 2010 run at Hollywood Park.

See also
Road to the Kentucky Derby

References

1970 establishments in California
Horse races in California
Santa Anita Park
Flat horse races for two-year-olds
Breeders' Cup Challenge series
Grade 1 stakes races in the United States
Graded stakes races in the United States
Recurring sporting events established in 1970